Handy Township is a civil township of Livingston County in the U.S. state of Michigan. The population was 8,006 at the time of the 2010 census, up from 7,004 at the 2000 census. The village of Fowlerville is located within the township.

Geography
Handy Township is on the west side of Livingston County and is bordered to the west by Ingham County. Interstate 96 passes through the township, with access from Exit 129 (Grand Avenue), serving Fowlerville. I-96 leads west  to Lansing and southeast  to Detroit.

The township is drained by the Red Cedar River and its tributaries, part of the Grand River watershed leading to Lake Michigan.

Demographics
As of the census of 2000, there were 7,004 people, 2,504 households, and 1,837 families residing in the township. The racial makeup of the township was 97.04% White, 0.19% African American, 0.97% Native American, 0.34% Asian, 0.01% Pacific Islander, 0.26% from other races, and 1.19% from two or more races. Hispanic or Latino of any race were 1.07% of the population.

There were 2,504 households, out of which 40.6% had children under the age of 18 living with them, 56.5% were married couples living together, 11.8% had a female householder with no husband present, and 26.6% were non-families. 21.0% of all households were made up of individuals, and 8.4% had someone living alone who was 65 years of age or older. The average household size was 2.78 and the average family size was 3.22.

In the township the population was spread out, with 30.9% under the age of 18, 7.3% from 18 to 24, 33.0% from 25 to 44, 18.9% from 45 to 64, and 9.9% who were 65 years of age or older. The median age was 33 years. For every 100 females, there were 97.5 males. For every 100 females age 18 and over, there were 94.1 males.

The median income for a household in the township was $49,447, and the median income for a family was $55,386. Males had a median income of $44,700 versus $29,696 for females. The per capita income for the township was $20,159. About 4.0% of families and 6.2% of the population were below the poverty line, including 6.1% of those under age 18 and 8.4% of those age 65 or over.

Notable people 

 Cindy Denby, member of the Michigan House of Representatives
 Charlie Gehringer, baseball player and official

References

External links
 Handy Township official website

Townships in Livingston County, Michigan
Townships in Michigan